Sir Ian MacGregor (1912–1998) was a Scottish-American metallurgist and industrialist

Ian MacGregor, Ian Macgregor or Ian McGregor may also refer to:

 Ian McGregor (malariologist) (1922–2007)
 Ian McGregor (Australian footballer) (born 1942), Australian rules footballer
 Ian McGregor (Scottish footballer) (born 1953)
 Ian Macgregor (born c. 1937), British investment executive and chartered accountant 
 Ian MacGregor (journalist), British newspaper editor
 Ian MacGregor (cyclist) (born 1983), American professional road racing